The Moultrie Flag, also known as the Liberty Flag, was a flag flown in the American Revolutionary War.

History

The Liberty flag was designed, by commission, in 1775 by Colonel William Moultrie, to prepare for war with Great Britain. 

It was flown by his troops in the successful defense of Sullivan's Island against the British fleet in June 1776. 

Fighting back during a ten-hour bombardment and siege, Moultrie's forces (primarily the 2nd South Carolina Regiment) eventually led the British to withdraw, saving Charleston for the Patriot cause.

During the battle, the flag was shot away, but Sergeant William Jasper ran out in the open and hoisted it again, rallying the troops until a new stand could be provided. The story of this event, along with the pivotal role of the battle itself, earned the flag the affection of the Patriot faction in South Carolina, as well as cementing it as a symbol of liberty in the South, and the new confederacy in general.

It therefore became the standard of the South Carolina Patriot militia, and when the war ended with the liberation of Charleston, on December 14, 1782, it was presented by General Nathanael Greene's "Southern Continental & Militia Army," as the first American flag to be displayed in the South.

The symbol in the top left corner of the flag is a crescent. Some say it is a gorget, others say it is a crescent moon, but all texts from the time describe it as simply a "crescent".

Heritage

Iconic to the state of South Carolina as a symbol of freedom and the Revolution, eventually this was used as the foundation for the state's own flag. The fort was renamed Fort Moultrie, and the flag is sometimes referred to as the Fort Moultrie Flag. It is occasionally rendered with the word liberty separately in white, along the lower center of the flag.

In addition to being the basis for South Carolina's flag, it is the flag of Moultrie County, Illinois.

The flag was featured on a 1968 US stamp. The reraising of the flag was commemorated on the South Carolina quarter of the America the Beautiful quarters.

References

External link

Flags of the American Revolution
History of South Carolina